The Feihong FH-97A is a prototype AI piloted unmanned combat aerial vehicle. It was developed as a "loyal wingman" drone, designed to fly along the J-20 fighter and suppress air defenses with electronic countermeasures, fly ahead to provide early warning, and absorb damage from attacks, as well as evaluating damage and conducting reconnaissance. It can also carry an array of munitions and use rocket boosters to takeoff without a runway. The FH-97A was developed by the Aerospace Times Feihong Technology Corporation and unveiled to the public in 2022 at the biennial China International Aviation & Aerospace Exhibition (Airshow China) in Zhuhai, China.

Specifications 
The specifications of the Feihong FH-97A have not been made public. However, it is widely suspected that Feihong copied large aspects Boeings MQ-28 Ghost Bat as they look almost identical. However, there are a few key differences such as the FH-97A having two engines while the MQ-28 has one.

References 

Unmanned aerial vehicles of China